is a Japanese footballer who plays for Japanese club Cento Cuore Harima FC.

Club stats
Updated to 23 February 2018.

References

External links

Profile at Blaublitz Akita

1983 births
Living people
Ritsumeikan University alumni
Association football people from Hyōgo Prefecture
Japanese footballers
J1 League players
J2 League players
J3 League players
Sagan Tosu players
Omiya Ardija players
Yokohama FC players
JEF United Chiba players
Yokohama F. Marinos players
Shonan Bellmare players
Blaublitz Akita players
Association football forwards